Joe Klanderman is an American football coach who is currently the defensive coordinator and safeties coach at Kansas State University.

Coaching career

Minnesota State
After playing on the defensive line for the Mavericks from 1997 until 2001, Joe began his coaching career at his alma mater in 2002 as the team’s defensive line coach. In 2005 he changed the position he coached, and began coaching the defensive backs. In 2007 he was promoted to the team’s defensive coordinator while also coaching the linebackers a position he held until the end of the 2013 season.

North Dakota State
In 2014 he joined the reigning FCS champions, the North Dakota State Bison as the team’s defensive backs coach. During his five year tenure in  North Dakota, the Bison won four FCS championships and his defensive backs room collected over one hundred interceptions.

Kansas State
In 2019 Joe followed Chris Klieman to Manhattan, Kansas and became Kansas State’s safeties coach.  On March 2, 2020 he was promoted and given the reigns over the defense as the team’s defensive coordinator while retaining his role in the secondary coaching the safeties.

Personal life
Klanderman and his wife, Amanda, are the parents of four children.

References

External links
 Joe Klanderman MSU Mavericks Profile

Living people
North Dakota State Bison football coaches
Kansas State Wildcats football coaches
Minnesota State Mavericks football coaches
Minnesota State Mavericks football players
People from Wisconsin
Year of birth missing (living people)
Minnesota State University, Mankato alumni